The 82nd Aerial Targets Squadron is a United States Air Force unit. It is assigned to the 53rd Weapons Evaluation Group and stationed at Tyndall Air Force Base, Florida.

The squadron was first activated as the 82nd Pursuit Squadron in 1942.  Flying Lockheed P-38 Lightnings, the squadron saw combat as the 82nd Fighter Squadron during World War II in the European Theater of Operations, earning a pair of Distinguished Unit Citations for its actions in combat.

Inactivated after the war, the squadron was activated for the air defense, first in the United States, then on Okinawa.  It was inactivated in 1972, but activated again the following year as the 82nd Flying Training Squadron and trained pilots for the Air Force for the next four years.  It was activated in its most recent role in 1981.

Overview
The 82nd Aerial Targets Squadron was the last USAF unit which flew the McDonnell F-4 Phantom II, flying the QF-4E,-G, and QRF-4C versions in the role of an aerial target.  The 82 ATRS also had a Detachment at Holloman Air Force Base to fly QF-4s in support of DoD testing in the White Sands Missile Range (WSMR) Complex.

A secondary mission was the use of man-rated QF-4s in support of the USAF Heritage Flight program at military air shows and other specific commemorative events as authorized by Air Combat Command.

The squadron also maintains three 120-foot drone recovery vessels and two smaller vessels to recover aerial targets and support range safety, patrol, and salvage operations. Squadron members also operate the Air Force's only two E-9A Widgets, a military version of the de Havilland Canada DHC-8.

In 2013, the squadron commenced acquisition of the first batch of QF-16 aircraft.  The QF-16 has replaced the QF-4 in the Full Scale Aerial Target (FSAT) role.

History

World War II

The 82nd Fighter Squadron saw combat in the European Theater of Operations (ETO) from 13 April 1943 to 25 April 1945, and training, maneuvers, and air defense, from April to September 1945. It was part of the occupation forces in Germany from August 1946 to June 1947. It served in air defense in United States from January 1949 to March 1953 and from October 1954 to February 1966.

Air Defense Command/Aerospace Defense Command fighter interceptor unit

During the Cold War, the 82nd Fighter-Interceptor Squadron was an Air Defense Command tenant unit based at Travis Air Force Base, California.

On 22 October 1962, before President John F. Kennedy told Americans that Soviet ballistic missiles were in place in Cuba, the squadron dispersed one third of its force, equipped with nuclear tipped missiles to Siskiyou County Airport at the start of the Cuban Missile Crisis.  However, before the crisis was over, on 26 October, the planes returned to Travis AFB because of overcrowding at Siskiyou.

In 1966, the 82 FIS was deployed to Naha Air Base, Okinawa.

The prime aircraft of the squadron was the Convair F-102 Delta Dagger, or "Deuce", which was the more common nickname. In order to deploy to Naha, each plane was configured with refueling probes and required extensive pilot training.  This was one of the few times such a modification was done to a relatively short-ranged jet fighter-interceptor.  In January 1968, the 82nd was scrambled to South Korea in response to the Pueblo Incident, where North Korea had seized the intelligence ship . The 82nd Fighter Interceptor Squadron maintained a presence in South Korea with a detachment of temporarily assigned aircraft (12) and personnel (TDY) to Suwon Air Base, ROK. The squadron continued this service until 31 May 1971 when the 51st Fighter Inteceptor Wing (51 FIW), along with all the other operational and support squadrons (including the 82nd Fighter Interceptor Squadron) were inactivated.

Air Training Command
From 1972 to 1976, the 82nd was redesignated as the 82nd Flying Training Squadron, part of the 78th Flying Training Wing of Air Training Command (ATC), conducting Undergraduate Pilot Training for USAF and NATO/Allied students at Webb Air Force Base, Texas in the T-41, Cessna T-37 Tweet and Northrop T-38 Talon.  With the end of the Vietnam War and a reduced need for USAF pilots, the 82nd was inactivated in 1976 and the 78th Wing inactivated and Webb closed in 1977 as part of post-Vietnam defense spending reductions.

Aerial Target Unit

On 1 July 1981 the 82nd Tactical Aerial Targets Squadron was assigned to the 325th Fighter Weapons Wing at Tyndall Air Force Base, Florida. On 15 October 1983, the 82nd Tactical Aerial Targets Squadron was transferred to the 475th Weapons Evaluation Group. It is now part of the 53rd Weapons Evaluation Group.

The 82nd Aerial Targets Squadron is very unusual by the type of aircraft it operates. This squadron is the only unit left in the USAF to fly the venerable F-4 Phantom II reduced to the role of aerial targets. Located at Tyndall Air Force Base, Florida, the 82nd is a subordinate of the 53rd Weapons Evaluation Group, assigned to Air Combat Command's 53rd Wing  at Eglin Air Force Base, Florida. The 53rd Group is responsible for conducting the USAF Air-to-Air Weapons System Evaluation Program known as "Combat Archer" from Tyndall and the Air-to-Ground version known as "Combat Hammer" from Eglin. Both bases are located at short distances from each other in the Florida panhandle. During these exercises, the 82 ATRS provides drone targets such as the QF-4 in the Full Scale Aerial Target role next to the MQM-107 Streaker and BQM-34 Firebee as Sub-Scale Aerial Targets. To perform surveillance and gather telemetry data during shooting over the Gulf of Mexico, the units uses the only two E-9A in the USAF inventory. The E-9A is a special version of the civilian DHC-8 ("DASH-8") specially equipped with a large phased-array antenna on the right side of the fuselage. The E-9A can record all data onboard and can retransmit it in real time to the ground control station. The 82 ATRS also has a Detachment at Holloman AFB which is responsible for FSAT operations at the White Sands Missile Range near Holloman Air Force Base, New Mexico.

Modifications to the airframe and installation of major systems to transform the McDonnell F-4 Phantom II took about four months. This included installation of the primary and back-up Automatic Flight Control System, Command/Telemetry System, VDOPS Scoring System, Flight Termination System, Visual Enhancement System and Ancillary Subsystems.

There are two kinds of QF-4s. The first is NULLO Full-Scale Aerial Target which keep the above basic drone conversions. For the 82nd, NULLO means Not Under Live Local Operation. A NULLO flight always required at least three drones, the one to be shot down, a spare and a manned QF-4 flying as chase plane. The second kind were manned full-scale drones fitted with advanced countermeasure systems installed by the USAF. While some of the twin-stick QF-4s retained their dual control system as trainers and both ejection seats in working order, the other manned QF-4s have the rear cockpit ejection seat removed. All NULLO aircraft have both ejection seats removed. Noticeable differences between the two are the six antennas from the VDOPS scoring system, the hump on top of the fuselage, a crude box on the left intake and a fairing in the left forward Sparrow III missile well.

Watercraft
Known as the "Tyndall Navy" is the Watercraft Branch of the 82 ATRS. It comprises three 120 ft drone recovery vessels designated MR-120 and two smaller vessels. These vessels are used for providing direct sea support to recover aerial targets like the MQM-107 and BQM-34, range safety patrols and salvage operations.

Lineage
 Constituted as the 82nd Pursuit Squadron (Interceptor) on 13 January 1942
 Activated on 9 February 1942
 Redesignated: 82nd Pursuit Squadron (Interceptor) (Twin Engine)' on 22 April 1942
 Redesignated: 82nd Fighter Squadron (Twin Engine) on 15 May 1942
 Redesignated: 82nd Fighter Squadron on 1 March 1943
 Inactivated on 18 October 1945
 Redesignated 82nd Fighter Squadron, Single Engine c. July 1946
 Activated on 20 August 1946
 Redesignated: 82nd Fighter Squadron, Jet c. November 1948
 Redesignated: 82nd Fighter-Interceptor Squadron on 20 January 1950
 Inactivated on 31 May 1971
 Redesignated 82nd Flying Training Squadron on 14 April 1972
 Activated on 1 December 1972
 Inactivated on 15 June 1976
 Redesignated 82nd Tactical Aerial Target Squadron on 17 June 1981
 Activated on 1 July 1981
 Redesignated: 82nd Tactical Aerial Targets Squadron on 30 September 1982
 Redesignated: 82nd Aerial Targets Squadron on 1 November 1991

Assignments

 78th Pursuit Group (later 78th Fighter Group), 9 February 1942 – 18 October 1945
 78th Fighter Group (later 78th Fighter-Interceptor Group), 20 August 1946
 4703rd Defense Wing, 6 February 1952
 4704th Defense Wing, 13 March 1952
 4702nd Defense Wing, 16 February 1953
 65th Air Division, 1 April 1953
 Iceland Air Defense Force, 8 March 1954
 528th Air Defense Group, 25 October 1954
 28th Air Division, 18 August 1955
 Attached to 78th Fighter Group, 18 October 1956 – 1 July 1960

 San Francisco Air Defense Sector, 1 July 1960
 Portland Air Defense Sector, 1 August 1963 (attached to 51st Fighter-Interceptor Wing after 17 February 1966)
 26th Air Division, 1 April 1966 (remained attached to 51st Fighter-Interceptor Wing to 25 June 1966)
 51st Fighter-Interceptor Wing, 25 June 1966 – 31 May 1971 (attached to 314th Air Division, 30 January-20 February 1968)
 78th Flying Training Wing, 1 December 1972 – 15 June 1976
 325th Fighter Weapons Wing 1 July 1981
 475th Weapons Evaluation Group (later 53rd Weapons Evaluation Group), 15 October 1983 – present

Stations

 Baer Field, Indiana, 9 February 1942
 Muroc Army Air Field, California, 30 April 1942
 San Diego Airport, California, 8 May 1942
 March Field, California, 3–10 November 1942
 RAF Goxhill, England, 1 December 1942
 RAF Duxford, England, 1 April 1943 – 11 October 1945
 Camp Kilmer, New Jersey, 16–18 October 1945
 AAF Station Straubing, Germany, 20 August 1946 – 25 June 1947
 Mitchel Field, New York, 25 June 1947
 Hamilton Air Force Base, California, 24 November 1948
 Larson Air Force Base, Washington, 6 February 1952 – 7 March 1953
 Keflavik Airport, Iceland, 1 April 1953-October 1954
 Presque Isle Air Force Base, Maine, 22 October 1954

 Travis Air Force Base, California, 18 August 1955 – 25 June 1966
 Deployed at Naha Air Base, Okinawa, Japan 17 February-24 June 1966
 Naha Air Base, Okinawa, Japan, 25 June 1966 – 31 May 1971 (deployed to Suwon Air Base, South Korea, 30 January-20 February 1968) Operation Combat Fox
 Webb Air Force Base, Texas, 1 December 1972 – 15 June 1976
 Tyndall Air Force Base, Florida, 1 July 1981 – present

Aircraft

 Lockheed P-38 Lightning, 1942–1943
 Republic P-47 Thunderbolt, 1943–1944
 North American P-51 Mustang (later F-51), 1944–1945, 1949–1951
 Republic F-84D Thunderjet, 1949–1952
 Lockheed F-94 Starfire, 1952–1954
 Northrop F-89D Scorpion, 1954–1955
 North American F-86D Sabre, 1955–1958
 Convair F-102 Delta Dagger, 1957–1971

 Cessna T-37 Tweet, 1972–1976
 McDonnell F-101 Voodoo, 1973–1982
 Convair PQM-102 Delta Dagger, 1981–1984
 Convair QF-102 Delta Dagger, 1981–1984
 North American QF-100 Super Sabre, 1983–1993
 De Havilland Canada E-9A Widget, 1988–present
 Convair QF-106 Delta Dart, 1991–1998
 McDonnell QF-4 Phantom II, 1996–2016
 General Dynamics QF-16 Fighting Falcon, 2013–present

References

 Notes

 Notes

Bibliography

 
 
 
 McMullen, Richard F. (1964) "The Fighter Interceptor Force 1962-1964"  ADC Historical Study No. 27, Air Defense Command, Ent Air Force Base, CO (Confidential, declassified 22 Mar 2000)
 
 NORAD/CONAD Participation in the Cuban Missile Crisis, Historical Reference Paper No. 8, Directorate of Command History Continental Air Defense Command, Ent AFB, CO, 1 Feb 63 (Top Secret NOFORN declassified 9 March 1996)

External links

www.tyndall.af.mil — U.S. Air Force Fact sheet which covers the 82nd Aerial Targets Squadron

Aerial Targets 0082
Military units and formations in Florida